Châteauguay-Laprairie was a former provincial electoral district in the province of Quebec, Canada.

Many sources (including the National Assembly website) write it as Châteauguay-La Prairie, but contemporary sources show the "Laprairie" part of the name written as one word. This alternate way of spelling it is probably by analogy with the modern-day La Prairie electoral district, which was spelled "Laprairie" before 1988.

It was created for the 1939 election, from parts of the Châteauguay and Napierville-Laprairie electoral districts.  It existed for only that one election.  It disappeared in the 1944 election and its successor electoral district was the recreated Châteauguay.

Members of Legislative Assembly
 Roméo Fortin, Liberal (1939–1944)

External links
 Election results (National Assembly)
 Election results (Quebecpolitique.com)

References

Former provincial electoral districts of Quebec